Yuji Nagao (born 27 May 1907, date of death unknown) was a Japanese track and field athlete. He competed in the men's hammer throw at the 1932 Summer Olympics.

References

1907 births
Year of death missing
Place of birth missing
Japanese male hammer throwers
Olympic male hammer throwers
Olympic athletes of Japan
Athletes (track and field) at the 1932 Summer Olympics
Japan Championships in Athletics winners
20th-century Japanese people